Ayn al-Mansi (Ein el Mansî) was a Palestinian Arab village in the District of Jenin of the Mandatory Palestine. It was depopulated as a result of a military attack in mid-April during the 1947–48 Civil War in Mandatory Palestine.

History
In the 1882  the PEF's Survey of Western Palestine (SWP) described  El Mensi as: "A small ruined village, with springs."

British Mandate era
In the 1931 census of Palestine, conducted by the British Mandate authorities,  Ein el Mansi had 73 Muslim inhabitants, in a total of 15 houses.

In  the 1945 statistics, Ayn al-Mansi had a population of 90 Muslims,  and the jurisdiction of the village was 1,295 dunams of land, according to an official land and population survey.  Of this, 186 dunams were used for plantations and irrigable land, 868 dunams were used for cereals, while 2 dunams were built-up (urban) land.

1948 and aftermath
Ayn al-Mansi  became depopulated after Military assault in mid-April 1948.

References

Bibliography

External links
Welcome To 'Ayn al-Mansi
 'Ayn al-Mansi,  Zochrot
Survey of Western Palestine, Map 8: Wikimedia commons 
'Ayn al-Mansi, from Khalil Sakakini Cultural Center
'Ayn al-Mansi, Palestine Family.net   
3ein Al-Mansi,  Dr. Moslih Kanaaneh
, 18.2.06, Zochrot
, from  Zochrot
Booklet about  Ayn al-Mansi (2006), downloadable, from  Zochrot

Arab villages depopulated prior to the 1948 Arab–Israeli War
District of Jenin
Former populated places in the State of Palestine
1948 disestablishments in Mandatory Palestine